This is a list of political entities that existed between 101 and 200 AD.

Political entities

See also
List of Bronze Age states
List of Iron Age states
List of Classical Age states
List of states during Late Antiquity
List of states during the Middle Ages

References

+02
2nd century
2nd century-related lists